C. V. Mourey (1791? – 1830?) was a French mathematician who wrote a work of 100 pages titled La vraie théorie des quantités négatives et des quantités prétendues imaginaires (The true theory of negative quantities and of alleged imaginary quantities), published in Paris in 1828 and reedited in 1861, in which he gave a systematic presentation of   vector theory.  He seems to be the first mathematician to state the necessity of specifying the conditions of equality between vectors.

Mourey also stated that there exists a more general algebra but, unfortunately, no other writings by him have survived.

Nothing is known about Mourey's life. The St. Andrews University's researcher Elizabeth Lewis, supposes Mourey  was a technician in Paris, but says she cannot positively identify him.

References

Bibliography

External links 
 

19th-century French mathematicians
1791 births
1830 deaths